Milauna Jemai Jackson is an American actress.  She is best known for her role as DEA Special Agent Kim Martinez in the British-American action television series Strike Back seasons four & five.

Early life
A native of Chicago, Milauna Jemai Jackson was raised on the South Side by her single mother.  To study in a safe environment, she lived part-time with her mother and partially with her grandparents. Before enrolling in the performing arts program at Marie Sklodowska Curie Metropolitan High School, she acted in church programs and community theater at a young age.  She had her mother Linda and Miss Lillian Monkus (deceased), whom she met in high school, as female role models. Her first television role was in 2000 in the court show Arrest & Trial (episode "Nightstalker") where she played herself. After high school, Jackson attended several colleges; Howard University and Cal State Fullerton, before enrolling at the University of Illinois at Chicago (UIC) where she began to appear in commercials, a Twista video, and industrial films.

Career
In 2002, she moved to Los Angeles to further her career aspirations. In 2012, she enrolled in UCLA and completed her education. During her orientation day she learned that director Spike Lee cast her for an HBO pilot Da Brick, "and that was the last part of my academic year." In 2004, two years later, Milauna Jackson landed a role in the TV series Cold Case (episode "Volunteers"). She also appeared in several TV movies, other TV series and films. She was also a regular member of Squad 85, an American comedy series created by Gregory Bonsignore. It was aired on YouTube's YOMYOMF channel and premiered on November 13, 2012.

A few weeks after her audition for the role of DEA SA Kim Martinez on Strike Back, Milauna Jackson found herself in South Africa for the filming of the show. It was in Johannesburg that the  military advisor for the show, Paul Hornsby, put her skills and knowledge in hand-to-hand combat, weapons work and other military techniques to the test. She also has a recurring role on NBC's Aquarius starring David Duchovny, as the wife of David's detective partner, Grey Damon. From 2016 to 2017, she had a recurring role as A.D.A. Rene Atwood in the ABC legal thriller How to Get Away with Murder.

Filmography

Film

Television

References

External links 
 

Actresses from Chicago
Living people
American film actresses
American television actresses
21st-century American actresses
University of Illinois Chicago
1976 births